Ambrose Alli University (AAU) is a state-owned university in Edo State, Nigeria. It was established in 1981 by the governor of Bendel State (now Edo and Delta States), Ambrose Folorunsho Alli. Initially known as Bendel State University, subsequently known as Edo State University, and finally changed to its present name in commemoration of professor Ambrose Folorunsho Alli, AAU is accredited and recognized by the National Universities Commission (NUC). The Ambrose Alli University Library houses the information resources for the institution.

The current vice-chancellor (acting capacity) of the university is Asomwan Sonnie Adagbonyin. He was appointed on 8 February 2022 by Governor of Edo state Godwin N. Obaseki.

The former vice chancellor, Ignatius A. Onimawo is credited for his unique deployment and application of information and communications technology (ICT) in every aspect of the day-to-day running of the institution.

Faculties 
 Faculty of Agriculture
 Faculty of Arts
 Faculty of Communication Sciences
 Faculty of Education
 Faculty of Engineering & Technology
 Faculty of Environmental Studies
 Faculty of Law
 Faculty of Life Sciences
 Faculty of Management Sciences
 Faculty of Medical Laboratory Science
 Faculty of Physical Science
 Faculty of Social Sciences
 College of Medicine
 Faculty of Basic Medical Sciences
 Faculty of Clinical Sciences

Library

The University Library began operating fully in 1983. The first university librarian was hired in 1982, and the library's initial book collection consisted of 36,509 volumes, including 30,818 books and 5,691 government documents, as well as 369 journal titles. At the time the library opened, there were 24 employees, including 20 junior and 4 senior employees. In the early years of its existence, the library experienced a series of moves as it searched for appropriate office space. The library's first move was from a temporary office to a temporary administrative building, then it moved to a three-bedroom home, before finally relocating to the Emaudo campus in December 1982, which was its permanent location. The library was then relocated again in 1987 to the Ujemen Campus, which had a more welcoming academic atmosphere. In 1999, a three-story library facility was officially opened by the head of state, occupying 14,000 square meters. The library system currently consists of a main library and several outreach libraries and it is a hybrid library system which provides print and non-print information resources.

Misconduct
Ambrose Alli University announced the sacking of four lecturers over gross misconduct. The dismissal was approved after the emergency meeting held on 1 December 2021.

Alumni
 
 
Samantha Agazuma, Nigerian cricketer
Alibaba Akpobome, Nigerian comedian
Benedict Ayade, governor, Cross River State
Buchi, a comedian
Aisha Buhari, wife of the current president, Muhammadu Buhari
Tony Elumelu, chairman, heirs holdings; successful Nigerian investor, philanthropist & entrepreneur
Don Jazzy, singer and entrepreneur
Festus Keyamo, lawyer, socialist, critic, columnist and human right activist
Samuel Oboh, Canadian architect and president of the Alberta chapter of Royal Architectural Institute of Canada (RAIC)
Omawumi, singer
Peggy Ovire, Nigerian actor
Chris Oyakhilome, founder, Christ Embassy

Photo gallery

References

External links
Official website

 
Educational institutions established in 1981
1981 establishments in Nigeria
Public universities in Nigeria
Education in Edo State